Tarachodes namibiensis is a species of praying mantis in the family Eremiaphilidae.

See also
List of mantis genera and species

References

Tarachodes
Invertebrates of Namibia
Insects described in 1996